Viliam Macko (born 22 October 1981) is a Slovak football player.

Club career

Budapest Honved
He made his debut on 25 July 2009 against Kaposvári Rákóczi FC in a match that ended 3–1.

Club honours

1. FC Tatran Presov
Slovak First League:
3rd place: 2003–04

MFK Ružomberok
Slovak Super Cup:
Winner: 2006

Budapest Honvéd FC
Hungarian Super Cup:
Runners-up: 2009

References
1. FC Tatran Prešov profile
Budapest Honved Official Website
Player profile at HLSZ

References

1981 births
Living people
Sportspeople from Prešov
Slovak footballers
Association football midfielders
1. FC Tatran Prešov players
MFK Ružomberok players
FC ViOn Zlaté Moravce players
MFK Dolný Kubín players
Slovak expatriate footballers
Expatriate footballers in Hungary
Budapest Honvéd FC players
Viliam Macko
Slovak expatriate sportspeople in Hungary
Slovak expatriate sportspeople in Thailand
Expatriate footballers in Thailand
Slovak Super Liga players
New Radiant S.C. players
Expatriate footballers in the Maldives